Hinako is a feminine Japanese given name. Notable people with the name include:

Actors
Hinako Saeki, Japanese actress
Hinako Sakurai, Japanese model
Hinako Sano, Japanese actress

Artists and musicians
Hinako Ashihara, Japanese manga artist
Hinako Sugiura, Japanese manga artist 
Hinako Takagi (born 1989), Japanese composer and pianist 
Hinako Takanaga, Japanese manga artist

Athletes
Hinako Murakami, Japanese professional footballer
Hinako Shibuno, Japanese golfer
Hinako Suzuki, Japanese professional footballer
Hinako Tomitaka, Japanese freestyle skier

Fictional characters

Game characters
Hinako Shirai, protagonist of the video game Blue Reflection
Hinako Shijou, in the game series The King of Fighters

Anime characters
Hinako (anime character), the protagonist in a three-part OVA series
Hinako Kitashirakawa (anime character), Tamako Kitashirakawa's late mother in Tamako Market and Tamako Love Story

See also
Hinako Note, a Japanese manga series

Japanese feminine given names